The Kurtez ambush occurred on August 12, 1943, near the village of Kurtez in the Kolonjë District of Korçë County in southeastern Albania. It was carried out by Balli Kombëtar during the Albanian Resistance of World War II. Two hundred local Balli Kombëtar militants, commanded by Qemal Burimi and David Smiley, ambushed a German convoy and a troop carrier, inflicting heavy losses on the German troops.

Background
After the Italian occupation of Albania in 1939, several resistance groups gradually formed. One of the most important of these groups was Balli Kombëtar, a nationalist organization led by Mit'hat Frashëri and Ali Këlcyra.

In mid-1943 the Special Operations Executive (SOE), a British clandestine organisation, sent several agents to Albania to cooperate with Balli Kombëtar and the Albanian National Liberation Front. David Smiley, one of the SOE agents, contacted a unit of two hundred Balli Kombëtar soldiers under the command of Qemal Burimi. After assembling at the village of Kurtez they decided to carry out an ambush against German troops on the main road near Kurtez connecting Korçë to Ioannina.

Ambush
Shortly afterwards a large German troop-carrier towing an 88 mm gun approached and was blown up on one of the two groups of mines. The German soldiers that were not killed by the explosion were shot by the Ballists while they were trying to escape by running back along the road. Eighteen German soldiers were killed, twelve of them while in the troop-carrier. The captured gun was pushed into the river-bed below the road.

About a half-hour later, a German convoy of twenty-three trucks approached the ambuscade from the direction of Leskovik. The first truck blew up on the second group of mines, while Smiley fired a 20 mm Breda gun on the following trucks, resulting in two of them bursting into flames. The Ballists shot down five German soldiers who tried to escape. The Albanian troops suffered no casualties during the attack. The German troops were from the 1st Alpine Division.

References 

Conflicts in 1943
1943 in Albania
Military history of Albania during World War II
Battles involving Balli Kombëtar
Battles of World War II involving Germany
Ambushes
August 1943 events